Justice Ofei Akrofi (born 1942) is a Ghanaian Anglican Bishop. He is the former Anglican Bishop of Accra (Ghana) and former archbishop (primate) of the Church of the Province of West Africa. He was elected to that position in 2003, which he held until 2012.
The archbishop is married to physician Maria Eugenia Akrofi and they have two children.

Education
Akrofi studied in Ghana and in the United States at Central Connecticut State College (University), receiving B.Sc. and M.Ed. degrees, and Yale where he graduated in 1976 with a Master of Divinity degree. Later, he taught at Cape Coast University and the University of Ghana before serving as dean of Holy Trinity Cathedral in Accra and later as Bishop of Accra from 1996 to 2012. In 2000, Akrofi received an honorary doctorate from Central Connecticut State University.

Anglican realignment
Like most African Anglican prelates, Akrofi is widely regarded as a conservative in the Anglican Communion, and has been involved in the Anglican realignment. The Church of the Province of West Africa was one of the first to break communion with the Episcopal Church of the United States over the question of admitting non-celibate homosexual clergy. He is a supporter of the Fellowship of Confessing Anglicans and of the Anglican Church in North America. He attended the Global Anglican Future Conference, in Jerusalem, in June 2008.

References

External links
Bio page from the Anglican Communion

1942 births
Living people
21st-century Anglican bishops in Ghana
21st-century Anglican archbishops
Yale Divinity School alumni
Central Connecticut State University alumni
Anglican archbishops of West Africa
Anglican realignment people